Moccas Monastery was an early mediaeval monastery near Moccas in Herefordshire, England at . Neither the foundation nor dissolution date is known.

References

Monasteries in Herefordshire